Tata Centre is a high-rise located in Kolkata, India. It is located on Chowringhee Road in the central business district of the city. The building houses most of the Tata Group's city operations.

History

Tata Centre is one of the tallest buildings in the CBD and an important landmark in the central part of the city. Designed by Indranil Sen, it is a commercial building and was built in 1963, making it the first 18-floor building in the city.

Details
The building has underground car park, central air conditioning, 7 high-speed lifts. It also houses a sub-telephone exchange for BSNL. Tata Centre is the marketing headquarters for Tata Steel. Other than Tata Steel, Metaljunction has their registered office in this building while the corporate which was also earlier in this building has been shifted to Salt Lake Sector V. Other registration and corporate offices of the Tata Group located here are Tata Metaliks Limited (PI and DI), Tata Pigments, TELCON, Tata International, Tata Bluescope Steel, Tata Sponge and Tata Mutual Fund.

See also
 List of tallest buildings in Kolkata

References

Office buildings in Kolkata
Tata Group
1969 establishments in West Bengal
Skyscraper office buildings in India